Wallingat River, a watercourse of the Mid-Coast Council system, is located in the Mid North Coast district of New South Wales, Australia.

Course and features
Wallingat River rises in low lands near Bungwhal, and flows generally north through Wallingat National Park, joined by three minor tributaries, before reaching its confluence with the Coolongolook River at Junction Point; descending  over its  course.

See also 

 Rivers of New South Wales
 List of rivers of New South Wales (L–Z)
 List of rivers of Australia

References

External links
 

Rivers of New South Wales
Mid-Coast Council
Mid North Coast